Filsdorf is a small town in the commune of Dalheim, in south-eastern Luxembourg.

References

Dalheim
Towns in Luxembourg